Steatocranus gibbiceps is species of cichlid native to the Malebo Pool and lower parts of the Congo River in Africa.  This species can reach a length of  TL.

References

External links
 Steatocranus gibbiceps Boulenger, 1899 - Global Biodiversity Information Facility

gibbiceps
Taxa named by George Albert Boulenger
Fish described in 1899